The Sarkari Mussalman (2018) is an autobiography of Lt Gen Zameer Uddin Shah, an Army Officer who belied in community apprehensions retired as the Deputy Chief of Army Staff. During his tenure as Vice Chancellor, Aligarh Muslim University was propelled to the top spot, amongst Indian Universities, in International University Rankings.

Translations
The autobiography  published in English.

Structure
The Sarkari Mussalman unfolds the story of Zameer Uddin Shah, who is a retired Lieutenant General of the Indian Army. He last served as the Deputy Chief of Army Staff (Personnel & Systems)  Indian Army. After retirement, he served for some time as an administrative member on the bench of the Armed Forces Tribunal. He was the Vice-Chancellor of Aligarh Muslim University.

References

2018 non-fiction books
Indian autobiographies